"Cried Like a Baby" is a song released by Bobby Sherman in 1971. The song spent nine weeks on the Billboard Hot 100 chart, peaking at No. 16, while reaching No. 9 on Billboards Easy Listening chart, No. 10 on the Cash Box Top 100, and No. 10 on Canada's "RPM 100".

Chart performance

References

1971 songs
1971 singles
Bobby Sherman songs
Songs written by Paul Williams (songwriter)
Songs written by Craig Doerge